In enzymology, a vellosimine dehydrogenase is an enzyme that catalyzes the chemical reaction

10-deoxysarpagine + NADP+  vellosimine + NADPH + H+

Thus, the two substrates of this enzyme are 10-deoxysarpagine and NADP+, whereas its 3 products are vellosimine, NADPH, and H+.

This enzyme belongs to the family of oxidoreductases, specifically those acting on the CH-OH group of donor with NAD+ or NADP+ as acceptor. The systematic name of this enzyme class is 10-deoxysarpagine:NADP+ oxidoreductase. This enzyme participates in indole and ipecac alkaloid biosynthesis.

References

 

EC 1.1.1
NADPH-dependent enzymes
Enzymes of unknown structure